Jose L. Linares (born November 30, 1953) is a former United States district judge of the United States District Court for the District of New Jersey, and the former Chief Judge of that same Court from 2017 to 2019.  In May 2019, he resigned as Chief Judge to return to private practice at McCarter & English.

Education and career

Born in Havana, Cuba, Linares received a Bachelor of Arts degree from Jersey City State College in 1975 and a Juris Doctor from Temple University Beasley School of Law in 1978. He was a supervising attorney of the New York City Department of Investigation from 1978 to 1980. He was in private practice in New Jersey from 1980 to 2000. He was a judge on the Essex County Superior Court, New Jersey from 2000 to 2002.

District court service

On August 1, 2002, Linares was nominated by President George W. Bush to a seat on the United States District Court for the District of New Jersey vacated by Alfred J. Lechner, Jr. He was confirmed by the United States Senate on November 14, 2002, and received his commission on December 3, 2002. He became Chief Judge on May 31, 2017. He retired from active service on May 16, 2019.

Notable case

In February 2016, Mercedes-Benz was sued by private plaintiffs alleging its BlueTec engines violate standards in a manner similar to the Volkswagen emissions scandal.  On December 6, 2016, Judge Linares threw out the lawsuit, finding that the plaintiffs had no standing.

See also
List of Hispanic/Latino American jurists

References

Sources

1953 births
Living people
Cuban emigrants to the United States
New Jersey City University alumni
Temple University Beasley School of Law alumni
Hispanic and Latino American judges
Judges of the United States District Court for the District of New Jersey
United States district court judges appointed by George W. Bush
21st-century American judges
Superior court judges in the United States
People from Havana
American judges of Cuban descent